Şinəbənd (also, Şinaband, Shinaband, and Shinabant) is a village and municipality in the Lerik Rayon of Azerbaijan.  It has a population of 593.

References 

Populated places in Lerik District